Céline Signori (born February 11, 1938) is a Canadian former politician. Signori was a two-term Member of the National Assembly of Quebec.

Early life
Signori was born in Saint-Jean-sur-Richelieu, Quebec in 1938 to Gustave Signori, a local teacher and principal, and Anne-Marie Pelchat. Signori studied nursing at l'École de puériculture de Notre-Dame-de-Liesse, a Church-owned school based at an orphanage in Saint-Laurent, Quebec. She served for fifteen years as a neonatal nurse at hospitals in her hometown of Saint-Jean-sur-Richelieu, Hôpital Charles-LeMoyne in Longueuil, and the hospital in Fort Smith, Northwest Territories.

Signori made a career change in the early 1980s, becoming a real estate agent with Royal LePage and becoming more involved in women's issues. She served as President of the Federation of Québec Associations of single parents from 1985-1992 and as President of the Fédération des femmes du Québec from 1992-1994. As President of the Federation of Québec Associations of single parents, she campaigned relentlessly for automatic collection of child support.

Member of the National Assembly
Céline Signori was first elected to the National Assembly in the 1994 election, in which the Parti Québécois formed the government. She was re-elected in 1998, but resigned in 2001 after being appointed to the Commission municipale du Québec, where she served until her retirement in 2006.

Later life
In retirement, Signori remained involved in women's issues, speaking at the 20th anniversary celebration of the Centre Rayons de femmes in Thérèse-De Blainville, which she was instrumental in helping form as a MNA.

References

1938 births
Living people
Parti Québécois MNAs
People from Saint-Jean-sur-Richelieu
21st-century Canadian politicians